Trunyan or Terunyan is a Balinese village (banjar) located on the eastern shore of Lake Batur, a caldera lake in Bangli Regency, central Bali, Indonesia. The village is one of the most notable homes of the Bali Aga people, the others being the villages of Tenganan and Sambiran. Trunyan is notable for its peculiar treatment of dead bodies, in which they are placed openly on the ground, simply covered with cloth and bamboo canopies, and left to decompose. The influence of a nearby tree is said to remove the putrid smell of the corpses.

Description
Trunyan is one of the culturally isolated Bali Aga villages in Bali. Trunyan village is located on the isolated eastern shore of the crescent-shaped Lake Batur, at the foot of Mount Abang, a peak on the eastern rim of the large caldera. The village is most easily accessible by boat.

The people of Trunyan are generally considered to be the Bali Aga people, the mountain Balinese. Unlike the lowland Balinese, Bali Aga people practice ancient rituals which predate the arrival of Hinduism or Buddhism. The Bali Aga of Trunyan is noted for unique traditions, even among the Bali Aga. According to copper plate inscriptions found in one of the shrines of the main temple of Trunyan, the temple dates back to at least the 10th century AD (833 saka). The village is believed to be much older than the temple.

Society
Trunyan society consists of two main "castes", the banjar jero and the banjar jaba. The castes are based on bloodlines dating back to the Gelgel dynasty. The banjar jero are descendants of the Trunyanese who went out of the village to be appointed by the kings of Gelgel to rule; whereas the banjar jaba are descendants of people who were ruled by the banjar jero. This caste system is one of few examples of outside society affecting life in the most isolated Trunyan. Another example of outside influence on the Trunyanese is the requirement for young men to travel through lowland Bali for a period of time to live as beggars. This practice is similar to the monks of Thailand, and is derived from a strong Buddhist tradition of the 10th-century.

Similar to other Balinese people, the Trunyanese place emphasis on prestige. Major ceremonies should be held as lavishly as possible. For example, wedding ceremonies are expected to be impressive, or not to be held at all. Since the Trunyanese economy is based on small-scale agriculture, accumulating money and possessions is relatively difficult. Many married couples with children in Trunyan perpetually postpone their wedding ceremonies just because of the high costs involved.

Funeral rites

The people of Trunyan practice customs found nowhere else in Bali, many even unique among the Bali Aga people. Among the unique customs of the Trunyanese is their treatment of dead bodies. Instead of cremations, the funeral rite of dead bodies in Trunyanese society is for them to be simply laid on the ground, covered by cloth and a bamboo cage, and left to decompose. The influence of an ancient banyan tree (known as taru menyan, literally "nice smelling tree") near the burial ground is thought to keep the corpses from smelling putrid. It is said that the tree emits a scent that neutralizes the smell of rotting bodies. It is also said that from this tree the name trunyan is derived. When a corpse has fully decomposed, the skull is placed on a stair-shaped stone altar which is located 500 meters north of the Banjar Kuban, a special place that can only be reached by boat. Only the bodies of married couples are allowed to be treated like this. If the deceased is not married, the body is buried at a cemetery.

These Trunyanese funeral rites date back to the neolithic Agama Bayu sect, one of the six most important religious-spiritual sects during the pre-Hindu period in Bali. The Agama Bayu worshipped the stars and the wind (angin ngelinus).

Volcano god Bhatara Da Tonta
The Trunyanese worship a local god and patron of the village known as Ratu Gede Pancering Jagat, known by the Trunyanese as Bhatara Da Tonta. The local god is connected with the Batur volcano. Bhatara Da Tonta is rendered as a four-meter tall neolithic effigy. The giant statue is housed in an underground chamber and is still regularly cleansed with rainwater, bedecked with flowers, and anointed with special oil. The manner of worship is based on an ancient bronze tablet from 911 AD which was found in the Pura Tegeh Koripan, a temple built in the form of a neolithic pyramid at Mount Penulisan, the second-highest point of the caldera of the Batur volcano. The effigy of Bhatara Da Tonta is brought out once a year during the Brutuk festival, which is held on the full moon of the fourth month (Purnamaning Sasih Kapat), which falls around October on the Gregorian Calendar.

Barong Brutuk
The Brutuk dance or Barong Brutuk dance is both a performance and a religious ritual. Brutuk dance performers wear sacred masks and two aprons of dried banana leaf fiber, tied around the neck, waist, and torso. The dance is performed with no music. The Berutuk dance is performed by a selected group of unmarried men who must undergo a purification ritual and isolation before the performance. During the isolation period, the men have to sleep in the temple, abstain from sexual contact, and learn the prayers for the ceremony from the temple priest.

See also

Bali Aga

References

Cited works

Populated places in Bali
Tourism in Bali
Tourist attractions in Bali
Death customs
Balinese culture
Hindu rituals related to death